Tarnation is an American band formed by Paula Frazer in late 1992, primarily recording on the 4AD label.

History
Tarnation originally consisted of Frazer on vocals and guitar. In 1993, she was soon joined by Brandan Kearney on lap steel guitar and Brent Johnson on guitar and vocals.  Next, musicians Michelle Cernuto, Lincoln Allen and Matt Sullivan joined the band.  This line-up then recorded the album I'll Give You Something to Cry About! in 1993 on Nuf Sed Records (Kearney's label).

Tarnation signed with 4AD Records and released Gentle Creatures in 1995.  The album includes seven re-worked songs from I’ll Give You Something to Cry About as well as new material.  Cernuto, Allen and Sullivan left the band shortly after its release in September 1995.

Frazer reformed Tarnation with a new line-up including Alex Oropeza on guitar, Bill Cuevas on bass and lap steel guitar, and Joe Byrnes on drums. Jamie Meagan joined on bass in 1996, in time to take part in the recording sessions for the band's final album, Mirador.

The band split up after the release of Mirador in 1997. Frazer continues touring and recording under her own name and as Paula Frazer and Tarnation. Oropeza, Cuevas, and Byrnes continued with their own band, Broken Horse. Allen continues writing and recording music with the San Francisco - based band Scratchland.

Discography
 I'll Give You Something to Cry About! (album, Nuf Sed Records, 1993)
 Gentle Creatures (album, 4AD, 1995)
 Mirador (album, Reprise/Warner Bros. Records, 1997)
 Now It's Time (album, Birdman Records, 2007)
 What Is and Was (album, New High Recordings, 2017)

References

External links
 Tarnation on 4AD Web Site
 Paula Frazer's Website (offline)

American alternative country groups
Musical groups from San Francisco
4AD artists
Reprise Records artists
Musical groups established in 1992